Ceratoxanthis saratovica is a species of moth of the family Tortricidae. It is found in south-eastern European Russia.

References

Moths described in 2010
Cochylini